Waller Thomas Burns (January 14, 1858 – November 17, 1917) was a United States district judge of the United States District Court for the Southern District of Texas.

Career

Born in La Grange, Texas, Burns was in the United States Customs Service before entering private practice in Galveston, Texas from 1882 to 1888. He became counsel to the Houston & Texas Central Railroad in 1888, and was a member of the Texas Senate from 1897 to 1901.

Federal judicial service

Burns was nominated by President Theodore Roosevelt on April 12, 1902, to the United States District Court for the Southern District of Texas, to a new seat authorized by 32 Stat. 64. He was confirmed by the United States Senate on April 24, 1902, and received his commission on April 22, 1902. His service terminated on November 17, 1917, due to his death in Laredo, Texas.

Note

References

Sources
 

1858 births
1917 deaths
Judges of the United States District Court for the Southern District of Texas
United States district court judges appointed by Theodore Roosevelt
20th-century American judges
People from La Grange, Texas
19th-century American judges